Hortensius can refer to:

The ancient Roman gens (clan) Hortensia.
Quintus Hortensius (dictator), Roman dictator in 287 BC.
Quintus Hortensius Hortalus (114-50 BC), Roman orator.
Hortensius (Cicero), a lost dialogue by Cicero from 45 BC, which Augustine of Hippo says (in Confessiones) turned him to the way of philosophy
The Dutch astronomer Martin van den Hove (1605–1639), also known as Martinus Hortensius.
Hortensius crater, on the Moon, which is named after this Dutch astronomer.
Hortensius is the name of the steward in the opera La fille du régiment, by Gaetano Donizetti.